Adipoyl chloride (or adipoyl dichloride) is the organic compound with the formula (CH2CH2C(O)Cl)2. It is a colorless liquid. It reacts with water to give adipic acid.

It is prepared by treatment of adipic acid with thionyl chloride.
Adipoyl chloride reacts with hexamethylenediamine to form nylon 6,6.

See also
 Adipamide
 Adiponitrile

References

External links 
 MSDS Safety data

Acyl chlorides
Monomers